Al lailu lana (translit.al-lail lana, English: The Night is Ours) is a 1949 Egyptian film directed by Mahmoud Zulfikar. It stars Mahmoud Zulfikar and Sabah.

Plot 
Nawal is a singer and Maysa, a dancer, two friends who work in a mobile band whose owner is Mohsen, the imposter who took them to the city of El Mahalla El Kubra and took the revenue and ran away, so the owner of the hall had to expel them and they had to spend their night in the street because the owner of the hotel wanted the fare, but they found an empty car on the road, so they slept in it. When the owner of the car came, Dr. Wahid Kamel, who was on a home visit, and when he got into his car, he knew of their presence and they recognized him after he was misleading that they were teachers. Wahid saw Nawal again, and they are red to fall in love with each other and Wahid told his father, the Pasha that he wants to marry a school teacher, and he refused. Nawal came out of the theater at night in acting clothes and makeup, so the morals police suspected her and chased her, so she hid in the apartment of Abbas Hamed, the painter who drank a lot until he became drunk and told her that he would kill his uncle who was a guardian on him and stole all his inheritance, then he passed out. Nawal tried to take the keys from his pocket, but she couldn't, so she spent the night in the apartment, and in the morning she managed to take the keys and went out, while the police raided the apartment and arrested Abbas on charges of killing his uncle, who had been killed the night before and who had previously threatened to kill him in front of witnesses. Abbas managed to escape and searched for Nawal for she is the only witness to his innocence. Wahid offered to marry Nawal, but she evaded him and decided not to meet him again, because she lied to him about her job and understood that she was a teacher and did not tell him that she works as a singer in a hall. However, Maysa called  Wahid and told him the truth, so he became more attached to her and married her despite the objection of his father, the Pasha, who then agreed. Abbas called Nawal and asked her to help him and testify that she had spent the night in his apartment and asked her to meet him in his apartment again to agree to surrender himself and her testimony in his favor, so she went to him behind her husband’s back, who watched her and doubted her behavior and thought she is in an affair with Abbas, and he divorced her instantly. Nawal was unable to meet Abbas because the police arrested him, and when Wahid learned of Abbas’ story, he agreed for Nawal to testify in his favour, despite the scandal that this caused him, and indeed Nawal went to court and acquitted Abbas and testified that she had spent that night with him, so the court acquitted him and the real killer was arrested, and Abbas swore to Wahid that his wife is honest and that she was a victim of misfortune. Finally, Wahid remarried Nawal and remained happily ever after.

Crew 

 Director: Mahmoud Zulfikar
 Writer: Youssef Gohar
 Studio: Aziza Amir Films
 Distributor: Bahna Films
 Music: Riad Al Sunbati and Charl Vusculo
 Cinematography: Bruno Salvi

Cast

Primary cast
 Mahmoud Zulfikar as Dr. Wahid Kamel
 Sabah as Nawal
 Suleiman Naguib as the pasha, Wahid’s father
 Nelly Mazloum as Maysa
 Salah Nazmi as Abbas Hamed

Supporting cast 

 Abdul Hamid Zaki
 Shafiq Nureddin
 Mahmoud Azmy
 Abdul Moneim Ismail
 Mohsen Hassanein
 Abdul Moneim Saudi
 Farag El-Nahhas
 Ali Kamel
 Mahmoud Nassir

References

External links 

 
 Al lail lana on elCinema

1949 films
Egyptian drama films
Egyptian black-and-white films
1940s Arabic-language films
Films directed by Mahmoud Zulfikar